Robin Hanson (born 2 April 2001) is a Swedish swimmer. He competed in the men's 100 metre freestyle event at the 2020 European Aquatics Championships, in Budapest, Hungary.

References

External links
 
 Robin Hanson at California Golden Bears

2001 births
Living people
Swedish male freestyle swimmers
Swimmers at the 2018 Summer Youth Olympics
Swimmers at the 2020 Summer Olympics
Olympic swimmers of Sweden
California Golden Bears men's swimmers
21st-century Swedish people
European Aquatics Championships medalists in swimming